Nothofagus moorei, commonly known as Antarctic beech, is an important Gondwana relict of the rainforests of the southern hemisphere. It occurs in wet, fire-free areas at high altitude in eastern Australia.

The Antarctic beech group (Nothofagaceae) is an ancient type of tree, of significance to southern hemisphere botanical distribution. Plants in the Nothofagaceae are currently found in southern South America (Chile, Argentina) and Australasia (east and southeast Australia, New Zealand, New Guinea and New Caledonia).

Taxonomy
Ferdinand von Mueller described the Antarctic beech in 1866, from material collected near the Bellinger River by Charles Moore.

Once referred to as 'negrohead beech', but now as 'Antarctic beech' (not to be confused with its South American relative, Nothofagus antarctica) is an evergreen tree native to the eastern highlands of Australia. N. moorei proposed to be renamed Lophozonia moorei in 2013. The change in name from Nothofagus to Lophozonia is controversial.

Within the genus, it is part of a lineage of three evergreen species, the other two being silver beech (N. menziesii) of New Zealand and myrtle beech (N. cunninghamii) of Tasmania and Victoria.

Description
These trees typically grow to 25 m (80 ft) tall and have large trunks to 1 m in diameter with scaly, dark brown bark. Maximum height is about 50 m. The leaves are simple and alternate, growing six centimeters long. The leaf color is dark green, with new growth brilliant red, or orange in spring.  The tree is deciduous in its native environment, but only partially deciduous in warmer areas, dropping half its leaves in autumn.  The leaves are triangular to oblong with fine teeth along the crenate edges. The plants have separate male and female flowers that occur on the same tree. The flowers are small and form inconspicuous clusters near the leaves towards the end of the branches. The fruit, produced from December to February, is a small woody structure of four prickly valves. Each fruit contains three small winged nuts.

Complicated root structures are frequently exhibited. These roots would once have been soil-covered, but have been exposed over the ages by erosion, and covered in moss and lichen. Many of the trees have multiple trunks emanating from a crown, formed by this root structure. Fires are detrimental to the survival of the Antarctic Beech which, unlike many other Australian plants, is slow to recover from fire.

Distribution and habitat

The Antarctic beech grows in cool temperate rainforests from the Barrington Tops plateau in New South Wales, north to the Lamington Plateau and Springbrook Plateau, in southern Queensland, between altitudes of 480 m and 1550 m.  It occurs in temperate to cool temperatures and with occasional snowfalls. Antarctic beech achieves its finest development at Werrikimbe National Park and Mount Banda Banda.

Comboyne
There are four known populations of the Antarctic Beech in the Comboyne area of New South Wales. In 1925, the botanist E.C. Chisholm wrote that the Antarctic Beech at Comboyne was "extremely rare, although many trees were undoubtedly destroyed during clearing." The Comboyne Plateau was mostly cleared between 1900 and 1925.

The Comboyne plateau is a scarp-bounded paleoplain located between the Mid North Coast of New South Wales and the Great Dividing Range. Miocene basalts overlie much of the plateau, creating relatively fertile red/brown soils.

In the southern third of the plateau are underlying Triassic sediments of the Lorne basin. The plateau has a wet, sub tropical climate, though subject to frost and occasional snow.

The population at Comboyne was considered likely to be extinct by the scientific community, until published in 1994 by the botanists Bale and Williams. This community of trees regenerates well from seed and is notably vagile, with many young plants.

It is the only other lowland (as low as 570 metres) population known, with those found near Dorrigo, to the north. The rainforest botanist Alexander Floyd considers the Comboyne examples of the Antarctic Beech, as part of the cool temperate sub type 49, of the rainforests of New South Wales.

History

At one time it was believed that the Eastern Australian populations could not reproduce in present-day conditions, except by suckering (asexual reproduction), being remnant forest from a cooler time. It has since been shown that sexual reproduction may occur, but distribution in cool, isolated high-altitude environments at temperate and tropical latitudes is consistent with the theory that the species was more prolific in a cooler age. The pattern of distribution around the southern Pacific Ocean rim has fed speculation that the dissemination of the genus dates to the time when Antarctica, Australia and South America were connected, the theoretical common land-mass referred to as Gondwana.

It is an ornamental tree and cultivated specimens tolerate −7 °C (19 °F), though wild plants growing on Barrington Tops have withstood record low temperatures of −17 °C (1 °F), no source provenance have been selected from there and other mountains, highlands or plateaus for cultivation.

References

Nothofagaceae
Fagales of Australia
Trees of Australia
Flora of Queensland
Flora of New South Wales
Endemic flora of Australia
Trees of mild maritime climate
Garden plants of Australia
Ornamental trees
Plants described in 1866
Taxa named by Ferdinand von Mueller